Givira variabilis is a moth in the family Cossidae. It is found in Argentina. It is also often known as mothra.

References

Natural History Museum Lepidoptera generic names catalog

Givira
Moths described in 1924